St. Louis Cathedral or Cathedral of St. Louis may refer to:

 Cathedral of St Louis (Plovdiv), Bulgaria
 Cathedral of Saint-Louis des Invalides, Paris, France
 Saint Louis Cathedral of Versailles, or Versailles Cathedral, France
 St. Louis the King Cathedral, Haifa, Israel
 St. Louis Cathedral, Beirut, Lebanon
 St. Louis Cathedral, Fort-de-France, Martinique
 St. Louis Cathedral, Port-Louis, Mauritius
 St. Louis Cathedral (Saint-Louis, Senegal)
 Saint Louis Cathedral (Carthage), or Acropolium of Carthage, Tunisia
 St. Louis Cathedral (New Orleans), Louisiana, U.S.
 Basilica of St. Louis, King of France, formerly Cathedral of St. Louis, St. Louis, Missouri, U.S.
 Cathedral Basilica of Saint Louis (St. Louis), Missouri, U.S.